Learn by Heart is a 2015 French comedy-drama film directed by Mathieu Vadepied. It was selected to close the International Critics' Week section at the 2015 Cannes Film Festival.

Cast
 Balamine Guirassy as Adama
 Ali Bidanessy as Mamadou
 Guillaume Gouix as Stanislas Mauger
 Joséphine de Meaux as The CPE 
 Naidra Ayadi as The interim agent
 Idrissa Diabaté as Adama's brother
 Marion Ploquin as The Teacher

References

External links

2015 films
2015 comedy-drama films
French comedy-drama films
2010s French-language films
Gaumont Film Company films
2015 directorial debut films
2010s French films